Edward James Jurak (born October 24, 1957) is an American retired baseball player. He played in Major League Baseball for parts of six seasons, from 1982 through 1989. Jurak played for the Boston Red Sox from 1982 to 1985, the Oakland Athletics in 1988 and the San Francisco Giants in 1989. After Boston released him in spring training of 1986, he played on the independent San Jose Bees of the California League that season. Jurak spent 1987 in the minor leagues for the Texas Rangers organization before returning to the big leagues in 1988. One of the finest moments of Jurak's career occurred during the Triple A All Star game in 1988. The game was nationally televised as a way to introduce the baseball audience to the best prospects in the sport. That night, Jurak, at the age of 30 and was hitting .314 for Tacoma, the top farm club of the Oakland A's, tripled and scored in the ninth inning as the American League defeated the National League 2-1. The National League had tied the game at one via a home run hit by Gregg Jefferies.

Jurak was a utility player, playing in the field at shortstop, first, second, third base, and as an outfielder in his major-league appearances. As a minor leaguer, Jurak won the 1981 Eastern League batting title with the Bristol Red Sox (AA affiliate of the Boston Red Sox).

Because of his Croatian ancestry, Jurak's 1989 Giants teammates nicknamed him "Croatian Man" in the clubhouse.

References

External links

Sons of Sam Horn wiki: Ed Jurak – Red Sox-centric wiki resource.

1957 births
Living people
Acereros de Monclova players
American expatriate baseball players in Canada
American expatriate baseball players in Mexico
American people of Croatian descent
Baseball players from Los Angeles
Boston Red Sox players
Bristol Red Sox players
Calgary Cannons players
Diablos Rojos del México players
Elmira Pioneers players
Indianapolis Indians players
Major League Baseball infielders
Mobile Baysharks players
Oakland Athletics players
Oklahoma City 89ers players
Pawtucket Red Sox players
Phoenix Firebirds players
San Francisco Giants players
San Jose Bees players
Tacoma Tigers players
Tulsa Drillers players
Winston-Salem Red Sox players
Winter Haven Red Sox players